Shoot-Out at Medicine Bend is a 1957 American Western film directed by Richard L. Bare and starring Randolph Scott, James Craig, Angie Dickinson and James Garner.

James Garner, who had a small role, said "it was always fun working with Dick Bare, and Randy Scott was an old pro, but the movie isn't worth a damn."

Plot

Captain Buck Devlin, and cavalry troopers Sergeant John Maitland and Private Wilbur Clegg, recently mustered out of the army, head to Devlin's brother's homestead to settle down. They arrived just in time to drive off an Indian attack, but are too late to save his brother. Faulty ammunition cost him his life. The three men set out for Medicine Bend to find out who sold the ammunition. The community also gives them all their funds to buy badly needed supplies.

On the way however, they are robbed of everything – the money, their horses, even their uniforms. Fortunately, they happen upon a Brethren (in Christ) congregation (who have also been robbed), and are given spare clothing. Devlin decides it would be a good idea to pretend to be Brethren while in town. They quickly connect the robbers, and later the defective ammunition, to Ep Clark. Clark controls the mayor and the sheriff, and has his gang waylay pioneers heading west and force other local traders out of business.

Devlin has Maitland and Clegg infiltrate Clark’s shady business by taking jobs at his store. Meanwhile, he goes to work for defiant competing merchant Elam King and his niece Priscilla. After gaining their trust, Devlin learns that King has a secret wagon train of goods, including weapons, coming in from St. Louis. Devlin starts stealing back Clark's ill-gotten gains at night, including his mother's brooch from saloon girl Nell Garrison, Clark's reluctant girlfriend.

Clark, now suspicious of the three strangers in town, tries to lure Devlin into a trap, but barely fails. He does, however, have the sheriff arrest Maitland and Clegg. They are swiftly sentenced to hang, but Nell has taken a great liking to Maitland and persuades Sheriff Massey to do one right thing in his life and free the prisoners; unfortunately, he is shot in the back by one of Clark's men. Nell then gets Brother Abraham, leader of the local Brethren congregation, to help foil the hanging and rescue the two men.

Devlin finally comes for Clark. They brawl (ironic, given the film's title), and Devlin is briefly knocked unconscious; his life is saved when Clark tries to shoot him with bad ammunition. Clark then grabs a scythe, but is fatally impaled when Devlin knocks him down.

Devlin and Maitland prepare to ride into the sunset with Priscilla and Nell respectively. Clegg surprises them by deciding to stay and serve a "hitch" with the Brethren.

Cast
 Randolph Scott as Captain Buck Devlin
 James Craig as Ep Clark
 Angie Dickinson as Priscilla King
 Dani Crayne as Nell Garrison
 James Garner as Sergeant John Maitland
 Gordon Jones as Private Wilbur Clegg
 Trevor Bardette as Sheriff Bob Massey
 Don Beddoe as Mayor Sam Pelley
 Myron Healey as Rafe Sanders, Clark's main henchman
 John Alderson as Clyde Walters, another of Clark's men
 Harry Harvey as Elam King
 Robert Warwick as Brother Abraham
 Richard Bellis as David Devlin
 Ann Doran as Sarah Devlin
 Nancy Kulp as Cleaning Woman

References

External links
 
 
 
 

1957 films
1957 Western (genre) films
American Western (genre) films
American black-and-white films
Films scored by Roy Webb
Films directed by Richard L. Bare
Warner Bros. films
1950s English-language films
1950s American films